Maxine Waters Willard (born Maxine Waters on July 14, 1945, in Texas) is an American singer, best known for her backing vocals.

She is sister to Oren Waters, Luther Waters, and Julia Waters Tillman. Maxine and Julia Waters are sometimes referred to as "The Waters Sisters". They are featured on Michael Jackson's 1982 album Thriller, and in the documentary film 20 Feet from Stardom.

References

External links 
 

Living people
Singers from Texas
American session musicians
1945 births